Ana Filipa da Silva Martins (born 9 January 1996) is a Portuguese artistic gymnast who competed at the 2016 and 2020 Olympic Games. She won a bronze medal at the 2015 Summer Universiade on the balance beam. She is the first Portuguese gymnast to win a World Cup gold medal.

At the 2021 European Championships, Martins became the first Portuguese gymnast to qualify to a European Championships event final, earning a spot in the uneven bars final. She also debuted a new skill, a Hindorff to mixed-grip, making her the first Portuguese gymnast to get a skill named after them in the Code of Points.

Career 
Martins competed at the 2012 European Championships, and the Portuguese team finished twenty-first in the qualification round.

2013 
Martins competed at the Cottbus World Cup and finished seventh on the uneven bars, sixth on the balance beam, and tied for seventh on the floor exercise. She then went to the European Championships in Moscow and qualified for the all-around final where she finished fifteenth. At the Ljubljana World Cup, she finished fourth on the uneven bars and seventh on the balance beam, and she won the bronze medal on the floor exercise behind Ellie Black and Noémi Makra. Then at the Anadia Challenge Cup, she finished sixth on the balance beam. She then competed at the World Championships where she finished twenty-seventh in the all-around during the qualification round, and she was the second reserve for the all-around final.

2014 
Martins competed at the Cottbus World Cup where she finished sixth on the uneven bars. She then went to the Osijek Challenge Cup and finished fourth on the uneven bars and floor exercise and eighth on the balance beam. At the European Championships in Sofia, she finished twelfth in the all-around. Then at the Anadia Challenge Cup, she won the bronze medal on vault behind Teja Belak and Elisa Hämmerle, the silver medal on the uneven bars behind Jessica López, and finished fifth on the balance beam. She won the gold medal on the floor exercise, and this was the first gold medal won by a Portuguese gymnast on the World Cup Circuit. At the World Championships, she qualified for the all-around final and finished sixteenth. She then went to the Medellín Challenge Cup where she won the gold medal on the uneven bars. She finished fifth on the balance beam, and she won the bronze medal on the floor exercise behind Mariana Chiarella and Saša Golob. At the Joaquin Blume Memorial, she won the bronze medal in the all-around behind Roxana Popa and Marta Pihan-Kulesza.

2015 
Martins began her season at the Cottbus World Cup where she won the bronze medal on both the uneven bars and the floor exercise. Additionally, she tied for sixth place on the balance beam. Then, she went to the Doha World Cup where she finished eighth on the uneven bars, sixth on the balance beam, and fourth on the floor exercise. At the European Championships, she qualified for the all-around final and finished eighth with a total score of 54.699. She won the all-around at the Portuguese Championships with a total score of 52.900- over eight points higher than the second-place finisher. Then at the Anadia World Cup, she won the silver medal on the uneven bars behind Jessica López. She then competed at the 2015 Summer Universiade and qualified for the all-around final where she finished fourth. She placed fifth in the uneven bars final and eighth in the floor exercise final. In the balance beam final, she won the bronze medal behind Yu Minobe and Polina Fedorova. At the World Championships, she finished thirty-sixth in the all-around during the qualification round. This result earned Portugal a spot at the 2016 Olympic Test Event.

2016 
Martins competed at the Doha World Challenge Cup where she won the bronze medal in the uneven bars and the balance beam. She then competed at the Olympic Test Event and finished thirtieth in the all-around. This result earned her an individual spot at the Olympic Games. She competed at the European Championships and the Portuguese team finished sixteenth in the qualification round. She competed at the 2016 Olympic Games and finished thirty-seventh in the all-around during the qualification round. This was the best-ever result for a Portuguese gymnast at the Olympic Games.

2017 
At the European Championships, Martins finished eighth in the all-around final. She then won the all-around at the Portuguese Championships. At the International GymSport in Sangalhos, she won the gold medal in the all-around, the uneven bars, and the balance beam. She then represented Portugal at the 2017 Summer Universiade with Diana Abrantes and Inês Romero, and they finished seventh in the team competition. Individually, Martins finished sixth in the all-around final. She then competed at the World Championships and qualified for the all-around final and finished eighteenth.

2018 
Martins competed as a guest of the Egiba Club at the 2nd Spanish League, and the club won the bronze medal. At the International GymSport in her hometown Porto, she only competed on the uneven bars but won the gold medal on that event. She then won the gold medal in the all-around at the Portuguese Championships. At the Guimarães Challenge Cup, she won the silver medal on the uneven bars behind Ahtziri Sandoval, and she placed fourth on the balance beam. She then only competed on the uneven bars and the balance beam at the European Championships, but she did not qualify for either event final, and the Portuguese team finished fourteenth in the qualification round. At the Szombathely Challenge Cup, she finished eighth on the uneven bars and fifth on the balance beam. At the World Championships, the Portuguese team finished twenty-eighth in the qualification round.

2019 
Martins competed at the European Championships and qualified for the all-around final where she finished in tenth place. She then won the gold medal in the all-around at the Portuguese Championships. She was then selected to represent Portugal at the 2019 European Games, and she qualified for the all-around final and finished fifteenth. At the Paris Challenge Cup, she finished fifth on the uneven bars. She then went to the Guimarães Challenge Cup and won the bronze medal on the uneven bars behind Frida Esparza and Elsa García and the gold medal on the balance beam. She then went to the World Championships and finished sixty-fifth in the all-around during the qualification round. This result earned her an individual spot at the 2020 Olympics.

2020–2021 
Due to the COVID-19 pandemic in Portugal, Martins only competed in one competition in 2020- the Portuguese Open in November. She won the gold medal on vault, uneven bars, and balance beam.

She then competed at the 2021 European Championships. She made history by becoming the first Portuguese gymnast to qualify for a European event final after qualifying fourth into the uneven bars final. She also became the first Portuguese gymnast to have a skill added to the Code of Points- a Hindorff release with a half turn to mixed grip. She explained on the Portuguese radio show TSF that she learned the move during the COVID pandemic while there were no competitions. She also qualified for the all-around final where she finished eleventh. In the uneven bars final, she fell and finished eighth.

References

External links 
 
 

1996 births
Living people
Sportspeople from Porto
Portuguese female artistic gymnasts
Place of birth missing (living people)
Gymnasts at the 2016 Summer Olympics
Olympic gymnasts of Portugal
Universiade medalists in gymnastics
Universiade bronze medalists for Portugal
European Games competitors for Portugal
Gymnasts at the 2019 European Games
Medalists at the 2015 Summer Universiade
Originators of elements in artistic gymnastics
Competitors at the 2017 Summer Universiade
Gymnasts at the 2020 Summer Olympics
Mediterranean Games bronze medalists for Portugal
Mediterranean Games medalists in gymnastics
Gymnasts at the 2022 Mediterranean Games
21st-century Portuguese women